Saumane-de-Vaucluse is a commune in the southeastern French department of Vaucluse. In 2018, it had a population of 949. It was the boyhood home of the Marquis de Sade.

See also
Communes of the Vaucluse department

References

Communes of Vaucluse